The 2022 NCAA Women's Gymnastics Championships was held from April 14–16, 2022 at the Dickies Arena in Fort Worth, Texas. The semifinals and the national championship were televised on ESPN2 and ABC, respectively.

Regional championships
The top two teams from each region will move on to the championship round, indicated in bold. The regional final competitions were held on April 2nd. The eight lowest seeded teams competed on March 30 in the First Round, followed by the Second Round on March 31.

 Auburn, Alabama – Auburn University, host (March 30-April 2)
Regional teams: No. 7 Auburn 197.775, No. 10 Kentucky 197.500, Georgia, Southern Utah (Session 1); No. 2 Florida* 198.775, No. 15 Denver 197.225, Ohio State, Iowa State, Western Michigan (Session 2)
 Norman, Oklahoma – University of Oklahoma, host (March 30-April 2)
Regional teams: No. 8 Minnesota 197.725, No. 9 California 197.300, Boise State, Utah State (Session 1); No. 1 Oklahoma* 198.250, No. 16 Arizona State, Arkansas 196.675, West Virginia, Arizona (Session 2)
 Raleigh, North Carolina – North Carolina State University, host (March 30-April 2) 
Regional teams: No. 6 LSU, No. 11 Missouri 197.425, Iowa 197.075, North Carolina State (Session 1); No. 3 Michigan* 197.800, No. 14 UCLA 197.400, Maryland, Towson, North Carolina (Session 2)
 Seattle, Washington – University of Washington, host (March 30-April 2)
Regional teams: No. 5 Alabama 198.175, No. 12 Michigan State 197.650, BYU, Washington (Session 1); No. 4 Utah* 198.200, No. 13 Oregon State, Illinois, Stanford 197.250, San Jose State (Session 2)

* – Denotes regional champions

Regional results

Norman Regional
First Round

Session 1 (Round 2)

Session 2 (Round 2)

Regional Final

Seattle Regional
First Round

Session 1 (Round 2)

Session 2 (Round 2)

Regional Final

Auburn Regional
First Round

Session 1 (Round 2)

Session 2 (Round 2)

Regional Final

Raleigh Regional
First Round

Session 1 (Round 2)

Session 2 (Round 2)

Regional Final

NCAA Championship

Semi-finals 
The top two teams from each semifinal advanced to the National Championship, which were televised live on ABC on April 16 at 1:00 pm ET.

Florida gymnast Trinity Thomas was the only gymnast to score a 10.000 in any of the semi-finals or final. She scored two 10.000s, one on floor in the second semi-final, and the other on floor again in the final.

National Championship

Individual results

Medalists

All-around

References

2022 in American sports
NCAA Women's Gymnastics Championship
2022 NCAA Division I women's gymnastics season
NCAA Women's Gymnastics championship
Sports competitions in Fort Worth, Texas